Mark Atkins is an Australian Aboriginal musician known for his skill on the didgeridoo, a traditional instrument.

Mark Atkins is also a storyteller, songwriter, composer and painter.  He descends from the Yamatji people of Western Australia. He was the 1990 winner of the Golden Didjeridu competition. He has worked with Robert Plant and Jimmy Page of Led Zeppelin, Hothouse Flowers, Marlene Cummins, Philip Glass, The Black Arm Band and the London Philharmonic Orchestra, among others.
 
In Didgeridoo Concerto (1994) he plays for over 50 minutes continuously using the circular breathing technique; an unofficial world record at the time.
 
In 2001 he collaborated with Wurundjeri elder Joy Murphy Wandin and composer Philip Glass in the concert work Voices, performed at the Melbourne Town Hall and New York's Lincoln Center. The composition was commissioned by the City of Melbourne to relaunch the Melbourne Town Hall Organ. 

Mark was profiled in the television documentary "Yamatji Man" in 2003.


Discography 

 Didgeridoo Concerto, 1994
 Plays Didgeridoo, 1995
 Didgeridoo Dreamtime, ARC Music, 1999
 The Sound of Gondwana: 176,000 Years in the Making (compilation), Black Sun Music/Celestial Harmonies, 1997
 The Rough Guide to Australian Aboriginal Music (compilation), World Music Network
 City Circles
 Ankala : Rhythms from the outer core, World Network
 Ankala & World Orchestra : Didje Blows the Games, World Network
 Walkabout
 Creeper Vines and Time, Maguari Productions
 Didge Odyssey, 2006
 The Reason To Breathe, 2006
 The Bushman, (independent release), 2010
 Dreamtime, ARC Music, 2011

See also 
 List of Australian Aboriginal musicians
 Music of Australia

References

External links 
 Extended Mark Atkins profile at the Australia Council
 
 Yamatji Man – documentary
 Didge Solo Live 2012 Live at The Gnaraloo Shearing Shed – 2012

1957 births
Didgeridoo players
Indigenous Australian musicians
Indigenous Australians from Western Australia
Living people
Storytellers